Pangkor Airport  is an airport on Pangkor Island, Manjung District, Perak, Malaysia.

Airlines and destinations

Traffic and statistics

See also

 List of airports in Malaysia

References

External links

Short Take-Off and Landing Airports (STOL) at Malaysia Airports Holdings Berhad
Aviation Photos: Pangkor Island (PKG / WMPA) at Airliners.net

Airports in Perak
Manjung District